Cecropia pastasana is a species of tree in the family Urticaceae. It is native to Colombia, Ecuador and Peru. Its natural habitats are subtropical or tropical moist lowland forests and subtropical or tropical moist montane forests. It is threatened by habitat loss.

References

pastasana
Near threatened plants
Taxonomy articles created by Polbot
Trees of Peru
Trees of Ecuador
Trees of Colombia